Janith Liyanage (born 12 July 1995) is a Sri Lankan cricketer. He made his international debut for the Sri Lanka cricket team in February 2022.

Career
He made his first-class debut for Ragama Cricket Club in the 2014–15 Premier Trophy on 16 January 2015.

In March 2018, he was named in Galle's squad for the 2017–18 Super Four Provincial Tournament. The following month, he was also named in Galle's squad for the 2018 Super Provincial One Day Tournament. In November 2021, he was selected to play for the Dambulla Giants following the players' draft for the 2021 Lanka Premier League.

In January 2022, he was named in Sri Lanka's Twenty20 International (T20I) squad for their series against Australia. He made his T20I debut on 20 February 2022, for Sri Lanka against Australia.

In July 2022, he was signed by the Kandy Falcons for the third edition of the Lanka Premier League.

References

External links
 

1995 births
Living people
Sri Lankan cricketers
Sri Lanka Twenty20 International cricketers
Ragama Cricket Club cricketers
Cricketers from Colombo